Louis-François Metra (1738 – 11 December 1804) was an 18th-century French journalist.

Banker and correspondent of Prussian king Frederick the Great, Metra mismanaged his business and took refuge in Neuwied, where he printed his weekly review  for which he is mostly known. The French journalist De Beaunoir also wrote for the review.

Metra also collaborated with Nouvelliste politique d’Allemagne published in Cologne in 1780.

References

Bibliography 
  Karin Angelike, Louis-François Mettra Ein französischer Zeitungsverleger in Köln (1770-1800), Böhlau, 2002
 Mónica Hjortberg, « Correspondance littéraire secrète 1775-1793 : une présentation », Acta Universitatis Gothoburgensis, 1987
 Antoine Alexandre Barbier, Joseph-Marie Quérard, Dictionnaire des ouvrages anonymes, Paris, Féchoz et Letouzey, 1882, p. 775

External links 
 Louis-François Métra on data.bnf.fr

18th-century French journalists
1738 births
1804 deaths